Estadio Campos de Sports de Ñuñoa was a multi-use stadium in Santiago, Chile. It was the home ground of the Chile national football team until the current Estadio Nacional de Chile opened in 1938.  The stadium held 20,000 spectators.  It hosted the Copa America tournament  in 1926.

External links
David Goldblatt; World Soccer Yearbook; 2002 

Copa América stadiums
Defunct football venues in Chile
Football venues in Santiago
Sports venues in Santiago